Thomas Christopher Smout CBE, FBA, FRSE, FSA Scot, FRSGS (born 19 December 1933) is a Scottish academic, historian, author and Historiographer Royal in Scotland.

Early life
One of the five sons of Arthur Smout, Christopher Smout was educated at The Leys School and Clare College, Cambridge.

Career
Smout taught at the University of Edinburgh, from 1959 until 1980. At Edinburgh, he rose steadily through the academic ranks in the Department of Economic History – as an Assistant Lecturer (1959–62), as a lecturer (1962–64), and as a reader (1964–70) before being appointed as professor of economic history in 1970.

At St Andrews University from 1980 to 1991, Smout held the Chair of Scottish History. He is now professor emeritus in history at St Andrews University.

Smout was a visiting professor at the University of Strathclyde from 1991; and he has lectured in Japan, in China, in the United States, in Canada and in Australia.

Smout has written extensively on demographic history and many aspects of economic history.  Since the mid-1990s, he has developed the new discipline of environmental history in Scotland, giving the Ford Lectures in Oxford in 1999, published under the title of Nature Contested, Environmental History in Scotland and Northern England since 1600. A History of the Native Woodlands of Scotland, 1500–1920, written with Alan R. MacDonald & Fiona Watson is the first modern history of Scottish woodlands. It examines the relationship between people and woodlands. His most recent publications in this field have been in woodland history and an environmental history of the Firth of Forth.  His focus extends beyond the purely academic. For example, Smout has argued that conservationists should judge species based on whether or not they are pests, ignoring their origins.

Smout used his position to argue in favour of reviving the title "Princess Lyon". He suggested that the Princess Royal should be known by this title when she is in Scotland, much in the same way her brother, the Prince of Wales and Duke of Cornwall is traditionally identified as the Duke of Rothesay, Earl of Carrick and Lord of the Isles when he is in Scotland.

Smout has also interested himself in small local issues.

Public service commitments
 St Andrews Centre for Advanced Historical Studies, 1992–97, Director.
 Institute for Environmental History, 1992–2001, Director.
 Scottish Natural Heritage (SNH), 1991–97, Deputy chairman.
 National Museums of Scotland, Trustee.
 Scottish Coastal Archaeology and the Problem of Erosion Trust (SCAPE), Chairman.
 Institute of Scottish Historical Research, 2007.

Royal appointments
 Historiographer Royal of Scotland, 1993.
 Royal Commission on the Ancient and Historical Monuments of Scotland.
 Royal Commission on Historical Manuscripts, 2002–5.

Selected works

 .
 .
 .
 .
 .
 .
 .
 .
 .
 .
.
 .
 .
 .
 .
 .
 .
 .
 .

Smout TC, MacDonald Alan R & Watson Fiona. A History of the Native Woodlands of Scotland, 1500 - 1920. Edinburgh 2005

Honours
 Order of the British Empire, Commander, 1994. 
 University of St Andrews, honorary doctorate, 1999.
 University of Edinburgh, honorary doctorate, 1996.
 University of Glasgow, honorary doctorate, 2001.
 University of Stirling, honorary doctorate, 2002.
 British Academy, fellow.
 Royal Society of Edinburgh, fellow.
 Society of Antiquaries of Scotland, fellow

Notes

References
 Devine, Thomas Martin and Paddy Logue, (2002).  Being Scottish: Personal Reflections on Scottish Identity Today. Edinburgh: Edinburgh University Press.

External links
 University of Edinburgh:  "Debating the Union of 1707." 10 January 2007—streaming audio

1933 births
Living people
Academics of the University of Edinburgh
Academics of the University of St Andrews
20th-century Scottish historians
Environmental historians
Commanders of the Order of the British Empire
Fellows of the British Academy
Fellows of the Royal Society of Edinburgh
People educated at The Leys School
Alumni of Clare College, Cambridge
Fellows of the Society of Antiquaries of Scotland
21st-century Scottish historians